Premigala Saval is a 1984 Indian Kannada-language film directed by V. Somashekhar. The film stars Tiger Prabhakar, V. Ravichandran and Archana. The story was written by popular Tamil actor - director T. Rajendar and it was a remake of his Tamil film Uyirullavarai Usha. The soundtrack and score composition was by Rajan–Nagendra and the dialogues and lyrics were written by Chi. Udaya Shankar.

Cast 
 Tiger Prabhakar 
 V. Ravichandran
 Archana
 Mukhyamantri Chandru
 Vajramuni
 Uma Shivakumar
 K. Vijaya
 Dinesh

Soundtrack 
The music was composed by Rajan–Nagendra, with lyrics by Chi. Udaya Shankar.

References

External links 

 Film at Youtube

1984 films
1980s Kannada-language films
Indian romance films
Kannada remakes of Tamil films
Films scored by Rajan–Nagendra
1980s romance films
Films directed by V. Somashekhar